The 2009–10 Cleveland State Vikings men's basketball team represented Cleveland State University in the 2009-10 NCAA Division I men's basketball season. The team was led by fourth-year head coach Gary Waters and played their home games at the Wolstein Center. They finished the season 16–17, 10–8 in Horizon League play and lost in the quarterfinals of the 2010 Horizon League men's basketball tournament. It was the 79th season of Cleveland State basketball.

Roster

Schedule

References

Cleveland State Vikings men's basketball seasons
Cleveland State
Viking
Viking